Sikkim University is a central university established under an Act of Parliament of India. It is in Gangtok. Its first chancellor was M. S. Swaminathan; Mahendra P. Lama was the first vice chancellor.

In 2008 the university started from four departments — Social System and Anthropology; Peace and Conflict Studies and Management; International Relations/Politics; and Microbiology. The university offers traditional courses in humanities, physical and life sciences, and forestry along with non-traditional courses that are unique and related to the state including subjects like ethnic history, mountain studies, border studies, and hill music and culture.

All the colleges in the state of Sikkim are affiliated to this university.

Schools
The university has the following schools, departments and centres of studies:
 School of Social Sciences
Department of Economics
Department of History
Department of Law
Department of International Relations
Department of Political Science
Department of Sociology
Department of Peace and Conflict Studies and Management
 School of Life Sciences
Department of Botany
Department of Horticulture
Department of Microbiology
Department of Zoology
 School of Physical Sciences
Department of Chemistry
Department of Computer Applications
Department of Geology
Department of Mathematics
Department of Physics
 School of Languages and Literature
Department of Bhutia
Department of Chinese
Department of English
Department of Hindi
Department of Lepcha
Department of Limbu
Department of Nepali
 School of Human Sciences
Department of Anthropology
Department of Geography
Department of Psychology
 School of Professional Studies
Department of Commerce
Department of Education
Department of Management
Department of Music
Department of Mass Communication
Department of Tourism

Affiliated Colleges
Damber Singh College 6th Mile Samdur, Tadong, East Sikkim
Government College Rhenock East Sikkim
Government Vocational College, Dentam, West Sikkim
Namchi Government College South Sikkim
Government Arts College, Mangsila, North Sikkim
Nar Bahadur Bhandari Government College, Tadong, East Sikkim
Sikkim Government Law College Burtuk, East Sikkim
Sikkim Government College Burtuk, East Sikkim
Sikkim Government College, Gyalshing, West Sikkim
Sikkim Govt. Science College Chakung, West Sikkim
Harkamaya College of Education
Loyola College of Education
Sikkim Government B.Ed College
Government Pharmacy College
Himalayan Pharmacy Institute, Majhitar, East Sikkim
Sikkim Government College of Nursing
Namgyal Institute of Tibetology
Sikkim Institute of Science and Technology

References

External links

 
Universities in Sikkim
Universities and colleges in Sikkim
Central universities in India
Educational institutions established in 2006
Gangtok
2006 establishments in Sikkim